The Look of Love is the sixth studio album by Canadian singer Diana Krall, released on September 18, 2001, by Verve Records. It became Krall's first album to top the Canadian Albums Chart. In 2002, the album earned Al Schmitt the Grammy Award for Best Engineered Album, Non-Classical, and received the Juno Award for Album of the Year in Canada.

Arranger Claus Ogerman uses a similar orchestration for "S'Wonderful" as the one he wrote for the 1976 João Gilberto album Amoroso.

Critical reception

Jim Santella of All About Jazz commented, "Lush strings and gliding flutes surround Diana Krall's tender vocals. Even her substantial piano interludes take on the appearance of drifting mists, through the mix of orchestral timbres. With an emphasis on her sultry vocal interpretations, the latest album reaches out to a broad, popular music audience. Nothing wrong with that. It's just that jazz fans usually want the improvised licks along with their melodies... By interpreting classic love songs, Krall's latest album turns toward romantic interests. The clutter of a large string orchestra, however, obscures the total picture".

John Kreicbergs of PopMatters wrote, "Simply said, her piano chops are more than adequate to back up her incredible voice. Yet this is exactly what makes The Look of Love so maddening. Krall's piano work is practically nonexistent on most of the tracks, save for a few perfunctory solos that often sink into in a sea of overly lush string and orchestral arrangements".

Doug Ramsey of JazzTimes stated, "The songs, including Burt Bacharach's title tune, are superb. The arrangements and performances enhance them. Krall's singing has improved with her every album. It is at a high level. If her record company can make her a major star with albums this good, and if it doesn't push her piano further into the background, serious listeners should have no complaint". A reviewer of Cosmopolis noted, "With her new album The Look of Love, Diana Krall confirms her exceptional status as a jazz singer. Her new CD is a touch too polished, too clean, but never kitsch, as one might have feared, since the album was recorded together with the London Symphony Orchestra. But the special, sometimes rough-edged character of her previous recordings is missing".

Track listing

Personnel
Credits adapted from the liner notes of The Look of Love.

Musicians

 Diana Krall – piano, vocals 
 Dori Caymmi – guitar 
 Christian McBride – bass 
 Jeff Hamilton – drums 
 Paulinho da Costa – percussion 
 Los Angeles Session Orchestra – orchestra 
 Russell Malone – guitar 
 Peter Erskine – drums 
 London Symphony Orchestra – orchestra 
 John Pisano – guitar 
 Romero Lubambo – guitar 
 Luis Conte – percussion 
 Claus Ogerman – orchestra arrangement, conducting

Technical

 Tommy LiPuma – production
 Al Schmitt – recording, mixing
 Aya Takemura – engineering assistance 
 Chris Clark – engineering assistance 
 Richard Lancaster – engineering assistance 
 John Hendrickson – engineering assistance ; additional engineering
 Doug Sax – mastering
 Robert Hadley – mastering
 Bill Smith – engineering assistance
 Nat Peck – contractor for the London Symphony Orchestra
 Jules Chaikin – contractor for the Los Angeles Session Orchestra

Artwork

 Hollis King – art direction
 Isabelle Wong – design
 Donna Ranieri – photography production
 Bruce Weber – photography
 Jane Shirek – photos of Diana Krall in car

Charts

Weekly charts

Year-end charts

Decade-end charts

Certifications

Notes

References

2001 albums
Albums arranged by Claus Ogerman
Albums produced by Tommy LiPuma
Albums recorded at Capitol Studios
Covers albums
Diana Krall albums
Grammy Award for Best Engineered Album, Non-Classical
Juno Award for Album of the Year albums
Juno Award for Vocal Jazz Album of the Year albums
Verve Records albums